Charles Georg Lomberg (4 December 1886 – 5 March 1966) was a Swedish decathlete. He competed at the 1912 Summer Olympics in the long jump, pentathlon and decathlon and finished in 17th, 16th and third place, respectively. He was awarded a silver medal in the decathlon after the disqualification of Jim Thorpe. In 1982 Thorpe was reinstated as the champion, yet Lomberg retained his second position and silver medal.

Lomberg won the 1912 Swedish decathlon title, beating Hugo Wieslander, but lost to Wieslander at the 1912 Olympics. He actively competed only in 1911–1912, and tried to qualify for the 1920 Games, but failed.

References

1886 births
1966 deaths
Swedish decathletes
Olympic silver medalists for Sweden
Athletes (track and field) at the 1912 Summer Olympics
Olympic athletes of Sweden
Athletes from Gothenburg
Medalists at the 1912 Summer Olympics
Olympic silver medalists in athletics (track and field)
Olympic decathletes